Américo Túpac "Tupi" Venero (born 22 February 1972) is a French-born Peruvian former professional tennis player.

A left-handed player, Venero represented the Peru Davis Cup team between 1995 and 2000, winning seven singles and five doubles rubbers. He won the deciding fifth rubber in the 1999 American Zone Group II final, over Mexico's Luis Herrera, to give Peru promotion.

Venero was the 1990 South American Games singles champion and won a bronze medal at the 1991 Pan American Games, partnering Patrick Baumeler in the men's doubles competition. This was Peru's first ever Pan American Games medal for tennis.

His only main draw appearance on the ATP Tour was in doubles at the 1996 Hellmann's Cup in Santiago and he won one ATP Challenger title during his career, which was also in doubles.

Venero began his first stint as Peru's Davis Cup captain in 2002 soon after retirement and is the current team captain as of 2020.

Challenger titles

Doubles: (1)

See also
List of Peru Davis Cup team representatives

References

External links
 
 
 

1972 births
Living people
Peruvian male tennis players
Tennis players at the 1991 Pan American Games
Pan American Games medalists in tennis
Pan American Games bronze medalists for Peru
South American Games medalists in tennis
South American Games gold medalists for Peru
South American Games silver medalists for Peru
South American Games bronze medalists for Peru
Competitors at the 1990 South American Games
Competitors at the 1998 South American Games
French emigrants to Peru
Tennis players from Paris
Medalists at the 1991 Pan American Games